There are around 120 villages in Nevasa tehsil of Ahmednagar district of state of Maharashtra. Following is the list of village in Nevasa tehsil.

A
 Amalner  
 Antarwali

B
 Babhulkhede
 Bahirwadi
 Bakupimpalgaon
 Barahanpur
 Belekarwadi

 Belpandhari
 Belpimpalgaon
 Bhalgaon
 Bhanshivare
 Bhende Budruk
 Bhende Khurd

C
 Chanda
 Chikni khamgaon No. 2
Chilekhanwadi
 Chinchban (shinde patil)

D
 Dedgao
 Devgao
 Devsade
 Dhangarwadi
 Dighi ( Nikam )
 Dighi - गट नं 87

F
Fattepur
 Gevrai

H
 Handi Nimgao
 Hingoni

J
 Jaigude Aakhad
 Jainpur
 Jalke Budaruk
 Jalke Khurd
 Jeur Haibati

K
 Kangoni 105
 Karajgao
 Karegaon
 Kautha
 Khadke
 Khamgao
 Kharwandi
 Khedale Kajali
 Khedale Paramanand
 Khunegao
 Khupati
 Kukana
 Khamgaon

L
 Landewadi
 Lekurwali Aakhad
 Lohogaon
 Loharwadi

M
 Mahalaxmi Hivare
 Maka
 Maktapur
 Mali Chinchore
 Mande Gavhan
 Mangalapur
 Mhalaspimpalgao
 Moraya Chinchore
 Mukindpur population 
 Murme
 Mhasale

N
 Nagapur
 Nandur Shikari
 Narayanwadi
 Navin Chandgao
 Newasa Budruk
 Newasa Khurd
 Nijik Chincholi
 Nimbhari 
 Nipani Nimagao

P
 Pachegaon
 Pachunde
 Panaswadi
 Panegaon
 Patharwala
 Phatepur
 Pichadga
 Pravarasangam
 Punatgaon

R
 Rajegaon
 Ramdoha
 Ranjangao
 Rastapur

S
 Salabatpur
 Saundala
 Shahapur
 Shinganapur
 Shingve Tukai
 Shirasgaon 
 Shiregao
 Sonai belhekar vadi
 Sukali Khurd
 Sultanpur
 Suregao Gangapur
 Sureshnagar

T
 Tamaswadi
 Tarwad
i
 Telkudgaon
 Toka

U
 Ustal Dumala
 Ustal Khalsa

V
 Vanjarwadi
 Vanjoli
 Wadala Bahiroba
 Wadule
 Wakadi
 Warkhed
 Watapur

Z
 Zapwadi

See also
 Nevasa tehsil
 Tehsils in Ahmednagar
 Villages in Akole tehsil
 Villages in Jamkhed tehsil
 Villages in Karjat tehsil
 Villages in Kopargaon tehsil
 Villages in Nagar tehsil
 Villages in Parner tehsil
 Villages in Pathardi tehsil
 Villages in Rahata tehsil
 Villages in Rahuri tehsil
 Villages in Sangamner tehsil
 Villages in Shevgaon tehsil
 Villages in Shrigonda tehsil
 Villages in Shrirampur tehsil

References

 
Nevasa